Hoxton Park Airport  was a general aviation aerodrome in south-western Sydney, New South Wales, Australia.

The aerodrome was non-towered, and so operated according to Common Traffic Advisory Frequency (CTAF) procedures.

Traffic was light; at the time of closure three fixed wing and one rotary wing flight training schools operated from this aerodrome, which bordered on a large flight training area, serving Sydney's general aviation community. A commercial skydiving operation was also based at the aerodrome. A self-service AVGAS bowser was available.

History
The aerodrome was constructed as part of a group of airfields to be used as aircraft dispersal fields in the event of Japanese air attack on the Sydney area. Aircraft revetment hideouts were constructed within adjacent vegetation to hide and disperse aircraft. The aerodrome was used as an emergency and training field and satellite field for Schofields, Bankstown and Camden during World War II by the Royal Australian Air Force.

The original airstrip was  but it was shortened after World War II. Several aircraft revetments that existed in the farmland to the west of the aerodrome may have been removed (possibly destroyed during the construction of the M7 motorway).

The aerodrome got caught up with the development of Western Sydney and closed permanently on 15 December 2008.

The runway was dug up and permanently destroyed on 16 December 2008. The taxiways were initially left in place but were destroyed with the hangars and airport buildings in early 2009.

The land is now owned by Mirvac with the intention to develop it into a distribution centre for the Sydney area.

See also
 List of airports in Greater Sydney
List of airports in New South Wales

References

 Official site
 Hoxton Park Airport plan

Military history of Australia during World War II
Military history of Sydney during World War II
Defunct airports in Greater Sydney